Taalpokhara is a natural freshwater lake located in Rampur, Palpa district in Nepal.

See also
List of lakes of Nepal

References

Lakes of Lumbini Province